KTAK may refer to:

KTAK (FM), a radio station (93.9 FM) licensed to Riverton, Wyoming, United States
KTAK (company), an information and communications technology business in Great Britain